The enzyme arylesterase (EC 3.1.1.2) catalyzes the reaction

a phenyl acetate + H2O  a phenol + acetate

This enzyme belongs to the family of hydrolases, specifically those acting on carboxylic ester bonds.  The systematic name of this enzyme class is aryl-ester hydrolase. Other names in common use include A-esterase, paraoxonase, and aromatic esterase.  This enzyme participates in bisphenol a degradation.

Structural studies

References

 
 
 
 
 
 
 
 

EC 3.1.1
Enzymes of known structure